Robyn Magalit Rodriguez is an Filipina American professor, author, and activist. She is currently a professor and chair of the Department of Asian American Studies at the University of California, Davis. In 2018, Rodriguez founded the Bulosan Center for Filipino Studies; which is noted to be the first Filipino Studies center in the United States. She is a former associate professor at Rutgers.

Biography
Rodriguez received her BA at the University of California, Santa Barbara in 1996, and her MA (1999) and PhD (2005) from the University of California, Berkeley all in sociology. Before coming to UC Davis in 2010, she was a visiting lecturer at Ateneo de Manila University, visiting professor at University of Kassel, and associate professor at Rutgers University from 2005-2010.

Rodriguez has been an ongoing proponent of implementing Ethnic studies as a California high school requirement. In response to recent criticisms of the proposed curriculum being non-representative of all groups, Rodriguez responded stating, "Ethnic studies as a name is kind of a misnomer. What we’re really contending with is race, the various kinds of inequality and exploitation for non-white people of color."

In 2018, Rodriguez founded the Bulosan Center for Filipino Studies, named after the Filipino-American author Carlos Bulosan, best known for his book America Is in the Heart. In October 2019, the foundation obtained $1,000,000 from the State of California with primary support from Representative Rob Bonta. In a press conference, Bonta expressed hopes that the sum be a "down payment" for ongoing funding. The funding is intended to contribute to graduate student fellowships and ongoing and upcoming research initiatives. The center hosts an annual research conference every May.

Research 
The "Welga! Digital Archive" is an ongoing project documenting and preserving the contributions of Filipino-Americans, including Philip Vera Cruz, in the Delano grape strike.

The center is planning to conduct a national survey on Filipino-American health and well-being.

Bibliography 
 In Lady Liberty's Shadow The Politics of Race and Immigration in New Jersey (2017), Rutgers University Press. 
 Asian-America: Sociological and Interdisciplinary Perspectives (2014), UK Polity Press. 
 Migrants for Export: How the Philippine State Brokers Labor to the World (2010), University of Minnesota Press.

References

Year of birth missing (living people)
Living people
American filipinologists
University of California, Davis faculty
Rutgers University faculty
University of California, Santa Barbara alumni
University of California, Berkeley alumni
Women orientalists
American women academics
21st-century American women